The men's lightweight event was part of the weightlifting programme at the 1932 Summer Olympics. The weight class was the second-lightest contested, and allowed weightlifters of up to 67.5 kilograms (148.8 pounds). The competition was held on Saturday, 30 July 1932. Six weightlifters from four nations competed.

Medalists

Records
These were the standing world and Olympic records (in kilograms) prior to the 1932 Summer Olympics.

René Duverger set a new Olympic record in press with 97.5 kilograms and in total with 325 kilograms.

Results

All figures in kilograms.

References

Sources
 Olympic Report
 

Lightweight